The Cheeky Devil is a 1932 German comedy film directed by Carl Boese and Heinz Hille and starring Willy Fritsch, Camilla Horn and Ralph Arthur Roberts. It was shot at the Babelsberg Studios in Berlin and premiered in the city's Gloria-Palast. The film's sets were designed by the art directors Willi A. Herrmann and Herbert Lippschitz. A separate French-language version You Will Be My Wife was also released.

Cast
 Willy Fritsch as The Young Man
 Camilla Horn as Alice Ménard
 Ralph Arthur Roberts as Adolphe Ménard
 Else Elster as Loulou Gazelle
 Maria Forescu as Loulous Mutter
 Anton Pointner as Henri Latour
 Alexa von Porembsky as Annette
 Erich Kestin as Emil
 Ernst Behmer as Hotelportier

References

Bibliography

External links 
 

1932 films
Films of the Weimar Republic
German comedy films
1932 comedy films
1930s German-language films
Films based on works by Louis Verneuil
Films directed by Carl Boese
Films directed by Heinz Hille
UFA GmbH films
German multilingual films
German black-and-white films
1932 multilingual films
1930s German films
Films shot at Babelsberg Studios